"Dus Bahane 2.0" is a Hindi song from the film Baaghi 3. The song was a recreation of the original "Dus Bahane" from the film Dus which was sung by Vishal–Shekhar featuring the vocals of KK, Shaan and Tulsi Kumar. The song features Shraddha Kapoor and Tiger Shroff.

Development
The song was recorded, mixed and mastered by Eric Pillai - Future Sound Of Bombay in Mumbai. The song is arranged and programmed by Meghdeep Bose.

Music video
The makers of Baaghi 3 released its first song "Dus Bahane 2.0" on Wednesday. The track is a rehash of the title track "Dus Bahane" of 2005 film Dus. The music video featured Tiger Shroff and Shraddha Kapoor.

Release
A teaser of the song was released on 1 February 2020. The official song was released on the T-Series's YouTube channel on 12 February 2020. The song was also made available for Online streaming on Saavn, iTunes and Gaana on the same day. The full music album was released on 5 March 2020 by T-Series.

Music credits
Credits adapted from T-Series.

 Vishal and Shekhar – composer
 Vishal Dadlani, Shekhar Ravjiani, KK, Shaan, Tulsi Kumar – Singers
 Panchhi Jalonvi – Lyrics
 Meghdeep Bose – Music Producer & Arranger
 Nitin FCP – Song Editor
 Eric Pillai – mixing, mastering [at Future Sound of Bombay]
 Michael Edwin Pillai – assistance mixing, assistance mastering
 Sohrabuddin – recording engineer [at T-Series Studio (Delhi)]
 Meghdeep Bose – recording engineer [at Sound Bakery (Mumbai)]
 Priyanshu Soni – recording assistance
 Prince Gupta – Choreography

References

External links

2020 songs
Hindi songs
Hindi film songs
Indian songs
Songs with music by Vishal–Shekhar
Vishal–Shekhar songs
T-Series (company) singles
Pop-folk songs